Jessica Campbell Jones Cage is a superheroine appearing in American comic books published by Marvel Comics. The character was created by writer Brian Michael Bendis and artist Michael Gaydos and first appeared in Alias #1 (November 2001), as part of Marvel's Max, an imprint for more mature content, and was later retroactively established to have first appeared in Amazing Spider-Man #4 (June 1963) in the Silver Age of Comic Books as an originally unnamed classmate of Peter Parker, created by writer-editor Stan Lee and artist Steve Ditko. Within the context of Marvel's shared universe, Jones is a former superhero who becomes the owner (and usually sole employee) of Alias Private Investigations. Bendis envisioned the series as centered on Jessica Drew and only decided to create Jones once he realized that the main character had a distinct voice and background that differentiated her from Drew.

Jones has since starred in three ongoing series: Alias, The Pulse, and Jessica Jones, the latter published as a tie-in with the self-titled television series. Alias ran for 28 issues before ending in 2004, while The Pulse ran for 14 issues from April 2004 to May 2006, and Jessica Jones debuted in October 2016. She became a member of the New Avengers, alongside her husband, Luke Cage, during Marvel's 2010 Heroic Age campaign. She has used various aliases throughout her history, including Jewel, Knightress, Mrs. Cage, and Power Woman. Jessica Jones has also been featured in various video games.

Jessica Jones has been described as one of Marvel's most notable and powerful female heroes.

Krysten Ritter portrayed the character in the Marvel Cinematic Universe streaming television series Jessica Jones and The Defenders. Elizabeth Cappuccino portrayed a young Jessica in the first and second seasons of Jessica Jones.

Creation 
Jessica Jones debuted in the Marvel MAX imprint series Alias in November 2001. The character and series were created by writer Brian Michael Bendis and artist Michael Gaydos. While Jones was created in 2001, she was retroactively established to have appeared earlier: in Alias #22, it is revealed that Jones appears just off-panel in the events of Amazing Fantasy #15, the first appearance of Spider-Man, and Bendis's New Avengers #51 retroactively establishes her to have first appeared in Amazing Spider-Man #4 (June 1963) as an originally unnamed classmate of Peter Parker. Alias ran for 28 issues from 2001 to 2004, with most covers drawn by David W. Mack. After the end of the series, Jones and other characters from the series moved to Bendis' subsequent series, The Pulse. In a 2005 interview, Bendis claimed "Originally, Alias was going to star Jessica Drew, but it became something else entirely. Which is good, because had we used Jessica, it would have been off continuity and bad storytelling." Previously, Bendis commented:

 I was at one time toying with doing Jessica Drew because she has the best hair of any superhero in comics, but this book is entirely different than what that idea was to be. This character is totally different in every way but sexual gender. And there's that Jessica name that's not going to help me convince anyone. Any writer can tell you that the development process can be a sparkling and surprising one. You start in one place and end up in an entirely different one. I was also toying with a pornographic version of Dial H for Hero, doesn't mean that this is that book either.

By the time Bendis was actively developing the title, Jones was his central character, one with a distinct background and voice from Drew's.

Jessica Jones appeared as a regular character throughout the 2010–2013 New Avengers series, from issue #1 (August 2010) through its final issue #34 (January 2013). In a Marvel Comics podcast, Bendis expressed his desire to incorporate Jones into the parallel universe Ultimate Marvel imprint. In Ultimate Spider-Man #106, she appears as a senior at Peter Parker's school.

Fictional character biography

Origin 
Midtown High student Jessica Campbell goes to school with Peter Parker, on whom she has a crush and is present when he is bitten by the irradiated spider which gives him his powers.

Jessica's father receives tickets for Disney World from his boss Tony Stark. On the way home, their car collides with a military convoy carrying radioactive chemicals. Her family is killed, and she spends several months in a coma. Upon waking, she is placed in an orphanage and adopted by the Jones family. Jessica later discovers that her radiation exposure granted her super strength, limited invulnerability, and flight.

Jessica's adoptive parents re-enroll her at Midtown High, where she is ostracized by her classmates, especially Flash Thompson. Peter Parker (who has since become Spider-Man) senses in Jessica a kindred spirit—someone who has also lost her family due to a tragic circumstance. Jessica mistakes his kind attention for pity and lashes out at him. She later witnesses a fight between Spider-Man and the villain Sandman in her school. This inspires her to use her abilities for positive ends.

Early years 

As Jewel, Jones has a fairly uneventful superhero career until she intervenes in a disturbance at a restaurant involving Zebediah Killgrave, the Purple Man. Killgrave uses his power of mind control to place Jones under his command, psychologically torturing her and forcing her to aid his criminal schemes. After Killgrave sends her to kill Daredevil at the Avengers Mansion, Jones is rescued by Carol Danvers, the only Avenger who actually knows her. Jones undergoes psychic therapy with Jean Grey of the X-Men, who places a special mental command in Jones's subconscious to protect her from further mind control. During this time, Jones develops a brief romantic relationship with S.H.I.E.L.D. agent Clay Quartermain.

Due to the traumatic violation of her mind by Killgrave and the fact that she was barely noticed missing for eight months, a demoralized and depressed Jones gives up her costumed superhero life. She briefly adopts a darker identity as the Knightress and interrupts a crime meeting between the Owl and a mafioso, through which she meets up with fellow superhero Luke Cage. After defeating the Owl, she and Cage develop a lasting friendship. No longer a superhero, Jones opens a private detective agency. Longtime friend Carol Danvers sets Jones up with Scott Lang (the second Ant-Man), and the two date for several months. She also has an off-and-on affair with Cage.

Killgrave, still obsessed with Jones, escapes from high-security incarceration, but with the mental defenses Grey gave her, Jones breaks his control and knocks him out.

Later, Cage and Jones admit their feelings for each other. After she becomes pregnant with their child, they commit to their relationship.

The Pulse and Young Avengers 

Jones takes a leave from the detective business and joins the staff of the Daily Bugle newspaper as a superhero correspondent and consultant, becoming a main character of the comic book The Pulse and a contributor to the same-name fictional newspaper supplement within. A pregnant Jones is attacked by the Green Goblin after the Bugle reported that he was secretly industrialist Norman Osborn. In response, Cage retaliates, and Osborn is exposed as the Goblin upon his defeat and incarceration.

Jones quits her job with the Bugle after publisher J. Jonah Jameson uses the paper to smear the New Avengers. Jones and Cage are living together when she gives birth to their child, whom they name Danielle after Luke's best friend, Danny Rand. Cage and Jones marry.

Jones appears as a supporting character in Young Avengers until the series ended. She returns in Avengers: The Children's Crusade #6 in which she, Beast, and Hawkeye attempted to defuse the situation between the Avengers and X-Men who were fighting over who was to punish the Scarlet Witch. She helps fight Doctor Doom and is present when Stature and the Vision are killed. She is seen hugging Hulkling in the final panel when the team is declared full-fledged Avengers by Captain America.

"Civil War", "Secret Invasion" and "Dark Reign" 
In Marvel's 2006–2007 crossover storyline "Civil War", Jones and Cage reject Iron Man and Ms. Marvel's offer to join the Superhuman Registration Act. As part of the New Avengers, Jones moves into Doctor Strange's Sanctum Sanctorum, but after an attack involving the demonic villain the Hood, Jones is shaken by the experience. Desperate to protect her child, she leaves the New Avengers and registers for the Superhuman Registration Act, ending her relationship with Luke Cage. Jones is among the heroes who emerge from the crashed Skrull ship wearing her Jewel costume, although it is later revealed this Jones was a Skrull. The real Jessica Jones appears in Secret Invasion #7, in which she joins in the heroes' fight against the Skrulls and is reunited with her husband. After the Skrulls surrender, the Skrull impersonating Jarvis disappears with their daughter, leaving Jessica desperate.

Jessica is unaware that Luke has asked Norman Osborn for help in their search for Danielle. Osborn helps Luke recover Danielle, and Luke gives the baby back to Jessica. Spider-Man reveals himself as Peter Parker to the New Avengers, leaving Jones shocked to see that her former classmate is Spider-Man. She then tells Peter of her former crush on him, only to find out that he did not recognize her all this time, let alone remember her name, only remembering her as "Coma Girl", upsetting her. She later assists the Avengers in rescuing Clint after being captured by Norman Osborn. Jessica reveals that she was inspired to become a superheroine after witnessing an early battle between Spider-Man and the Sandman. Peter then tries to convince Jessica to return to the life of a superhero, suggesting that she could provide a better example for her daughter by going into action as a hero rather than simply telling her daughter about her old career.

2010–present 

During the storylines of Marvel's 2010 "Heroic Age" branding campaign, Jessica returns to her costumed identity of Jewel and becomes a member of the New Avengers when the title relaunched in June 2010. She and Luke began searching for a nanny, interviewing characters featured from other comics set in the Marvel Universe. Ultimately, Squirrel Girl is chosen as Danielle's nanny. In The New Avengers #8, Jessica takes the name Power Woman to both honor her husband, Power Man (Luke Cage), and to be a role model for their daughter. However, following several incidents revolving around Thule Society attacking Avengers Mansion, and Norman Osborn's threat, Jessica quits the team and goes into hiding, realizing that it is too dangerous for Danielle to remain in Avengers Mansion due to the numerous potential threats.

Jessica later appears as an ally to the Mighty Avengers team formed by Luke Cage. Jessica and Danielle lived in the apartment of the Gem Theater, which was serving as the Mighty Avenger's base of operations. She and Luke would later be confronted by the Superior Spider-Man and his Spider Robots, who offered her a place on a different type of Avengers team that was to be run by him. Jessica swiftly found a babysitter for her child and refused before delivering a powerful punch to Spider-Man's face for his threat. The group was later backed up by She-Hulk and she and Jessica decided to go out for coffee. Jessica and Luke later switched apartments with an old friend of Luke's named David Griffiths. While moving in, Jessica spoke to the Blue Marvel about what it is like to raise a child of superheroes and expressed both her support and annoyance at her husband's choice to start another team of Avengers.

During the "Secret Empire" storyline, Jessica Jones became a member of the Defenders alongside Daredevil, Iron Fist, and Luke Cage. Alongside Cloak and Dagger, Doctor Strange, and Spider-Woman, she fought the Army of Evil during Hydra's rise to power where they were defeated by Nitro. Jessica Jones and those with him were trapped in the Darkforce dome by Blackout when his powers were enhanced by Baron Helmut Zemo using the Darkhold.

In October 2016, Jessica Jones, a new ongoing series, debuted. Another title, Defenders, was launched in 2017. Jessica is one of its main characters.

During the "Hunt for Wolverine" storyline, Jessica Jones and Luke Cage assist Iron Man and Spider-Man in searching for Wolverine when his body has gone missing from his unmarked grave where they attend an underworld auction and fight Mister Sinister. After the mission ends, Jessica and Luke learn from Tony Stark what he found in Mister Sinister's database as he informs them that one of the X-Men members is not a mutant and is a genetically-altered sleeper agent.

In 2022, The Variants, a five-issue limited series by writer Gail Simone and artist Phil Noto, began.  The series is about Jessica taking on a case that leads her to meet alternate universe versions of herself.

Powers and abilities 
After coming into contact with experimental chemicals and spending some time in a coma, Jessica emerged with superhuman abilities. She possesses superhuman strength and durability, as well as flight, and can block mind control. She shows the capacity to lift a two-ton police car with little effort. Her strength has allowed her to lift up a giant-sized Goliath by the nostrils and toss him a short distance, break Atlas's nose, and render her fellow superheroine Jessica Drew unconscious with a single punch to the face. She later withstood being punched by a human on Mutant-Growth Hormone, sustained only mild bruising and a bloody nose, and was able to recover in moments, after being shocked by Jessica Drew's venom blasts. Despite this resistance to harm, Jessica sustained severe injuries, including a damaged spine and neck, a detached retina, and a broken nose after being attacked by both the Vision and Iron Man.

The character is also able to heal faster and more effectively than normal rate.

Jessica is also able to fly, and while she was able to fly quite well during her early years as a heroine, she has admitted that her flying ability degenerated while she was no longer an active hero. She has since displayed improved flying ability after joining the New Avengers.

After her ordeal at the hands of the Purple Man, Jessica was given a degree of psionic protection by Jean Grey of the X-Men. This psionic protection was sufficient to protect Jessica against a second attack by the Purple Man, though she had to "trigger" this resistance on her own.

In addition to her superhuman powers, Jessica is a skilled detective and investigative journalist.

Cultural impact and legacy

Critical reception 
George Marston of Newsarama called Jessica Jones one of the "best female superheroes of all time," asserting, "Jessica Jones isn't your typical superhero – like her husband, Luke Cage, she doesn't even have a superhero codename that's stuck. But that's part of what makes her so great, and so unique among not just female superheroes, but superheroes in general. Gifted (or cursed, when you consider how she got her powers) with super-strength, flight, and invulnerability, Jessica got her powers as a teen when a chemical truck collided with her family's car, killing her parents and putting her in a coma. Though the development of her powers led to personal struggles through her early life (including a notoriously horrific kidnapping by the mind-controlling Purple Man), Jessica eventually became an Avenger, and one of the defining heroes of a certain era of the Marvel Universe. She's also a superhero mom, and even though that's caused its share of troubles for her, Jessica has fought through it all as a committed family woman as well as a hero." Gavia Baker-Whitelaw of The Daily Dot referred to Jessica Jones as one "greatest female superheroes of all time," stating, "A truly modern subversion of the superhero genre. Jessica Jones is a recent addition to Marvel canon, created for the adult-rated comic Alias. She’s a hard-drinking private detective with super strength and a dark past. She used to be a traditional costumed superheroine named Jewel. However, she dropped the persona after being brainwashed and abused by the mind-controlling supervillain Kilgrave. Now struggling with PTSD and alcoholism, she’s a private eye in New York. Best known for her acclaimed Netflix series, Jessica Jones is married to Luke Cage. She often teams up with the Avengers and other street-level New York superheroes in the comics." Riya Hotchandani of Sportskeeda named Jessica Jones one of the "most skilled detectives in comics," saying, "Jessica Jones is widely known among comic book fans as one of the greatest detectives in the Marvel universe. From her first appearance as a private detective in Alias Investigations to being an Avenger after marrying Luke Cage, Jones has solved many challenging cases. She is clever and street smart and possesses a range of powers like superhuman strength, superhuman durability, telepathic resistance, and accelerated healing. Apart from being a star PI, Jessica has also been an investigative journalist for The Pulse, which has made her skills shine in front of the world." Deirdre Kaye of Scary Mommy of described Jessica Jones as one of the "most popular and well-loved female Marvel characters," writing, "What’s not to love about the surly and sarcastic Jessica Jones? You may remember her from the brilliant Netflix series. She has a pretty average comic book existence: Dead parents, run-in with a super serum that gives her special powers… you know the drill. The difference with Jessica Jones really lies in her personality. She’s like a female Wolverine — leather jacket and all. While she spent some time in full superhero mode as Jewel, fighting with the Avengers, that level of optimism just wasn't her speed. Jessica is a private detective a la Veronica Mars."

Shawn S. Lealos of Screen Rant referred to Jessica Jones as a "huge star," stating, "Jessica Jones became a household name when her Marvel Netflix series was a critical hit. The character is a relative newcomer to the Marvel Universe, debuting in 2001, but she ended up as an important street-level hero and was quickly a member of the Avengers shortly after her introduction into the comics. While the Netflix series followed her as a private investigator, she actually has a rich history in Marvel Comics, although it was always behind the scenes until her official debut. The hero has gone on to marry one of Marvel's strongest heroes and has been part of some of the biggest crossover storylines in the company since her debut, giving her a history that is much deeper than her short time in comics might indicate. [...] Jessica Jones has done a lot since she made her debut in Marvel Comics. However, she has also paid it forward. In much the same way that Captain Marvel helped save Jessica and set her on the path to recovery, Jones saw some teenage heroes in need of direction and was instrumental in helping the Young Avengers form." Gary Walker of CBR.com called Jessica Jones one of Marvel's "most seasoned street-level heroes," stating, "Jessica Jones has the abilities of someone who should be helping out Captain Marvel or even the Guardians of the Galaxy. She had issues learning to fly initially, though this has since been mastered. Her strength and durability would allow her to hold court among the chief Avengers. This is not Jessica’s calling however. She’s done a great job battling her own inner demons, trying to become a better person and hero. Her bond with Luke Cage elevated not only her own self-confidence but made both partners better by association. Using her private investigator skill-set, she’s one hell of a vigilante and one resourceful mother!" Rosie Knight of Nerdist described Jessica Jones as one of the "most brilliant women who solve crimes in the pages of your fave comic," writing, "Now a very famous sorta-superhero due to her very own show, Jessica Jones began as an unconventional comic book from Brian Michael Bendis and Michael Gaydos under Marvel’s mature Max imprint. The story of a retired lesser-known superhero named Jewel who becomes a private eye, the explicit comic explored the harsh realities of being a hero. Jessica tries to uncover the secrets of her past and deal with her trauma all while brushing with other Marvel characters like Captain America, J. Jonah Jameson, and Rick Jones." Ned Beauman of The Guardian asserted, "There's still a very long way to go - and you might feel that, if you want to see female characters treated with any respect by their creators, the male-dominated world of superhero comics is just not for you. But there are exceptions. Two of Marvel's most entertaining writers - Buffy creator Joss Whedon and Lost staff writer Brian K Vaughn - have casts full of believable women. (Try Whedon's Astonishing X Men Volume 1: Gifted or Vaughn's Runaways Volume 1: Pride and Joy.) But perhaps the greatest female superhero of recent years is Brian Michael Bendis's Jessica Jones. Formerly a flying crime-fighter called Jewel, Jones hangs up her cape to become a private investigator. For more than 40 issues - now collected in a series of paperbacks starting with Alias Volume 1 - Bendis took us inside her head, creating one of the bravest, wittiest and most sensitive portraits of a female character that superhero comics have ever seen. Plus, she had a realistic body and didn't try to battle evil in a gold bikini and stiletto heels."

Accolades 

 In 2016, The Hollywood Reporter ranked Jessica Jones 28th in their "50 Favorite Female Characters" list.
 In 2016, Entertainment Weekly ranked Jessica Jones 39th in their "Most Powerful Superheroes" list.
 In 2017, The Daily Dot  ranked Jessica Jones 21st in their "Top 33 female superheroes of all time" list.
 In 2018, CBR.com ranked Jessica Jones 7th in their "Marvel's 20 Most Seasoned Street-Level Heroes" list.
 In 2018, GameSpot ranked Jessica Jones 25th in their "50 Most Important Superheroes" list.
 In 2019, Comicbook.com ranked Jessica Jones 23rd in their "50 Most Important Superheroes Ever" list.
 In 2019, CBR.com ranked Jessica Jones 6th in their "Marvel: 10 Best Street Level Heroes" list.
 In 2020, Scary Mommy ranked Jessica Jones 4th in their "Looking For A Role Model? These 195+ Marvel Female Characters Are Truly Heroic" list.
 In 2020, CBR.com ranked Jessica Jones 3rd in their "10 Best Detectives In Marvel Comics" list.
 In 2020, TheWrap included Jessica Jones in their "24 Badass Female Superheroes" list.
 In 2021, CBR.com ranked Jessica Jones 16th in their "20 Most Powerful Female Members Of The Avengers" list and 20th in their "20 Strongest Female Superheroes" list.
 In 2022, Newsarama ranked Jessica Jones 22nd in their "Best female superheroes" list.
 In 2022, The A.V. Club ranked Jessica Jones 16th in their "100 best Marvel characters" list.
 In 2022, Sportskeeda ranked Jessica Jones 5th in their "Ten best detectives in comics" list.
 In 2022, Bustle ranked Jessica Jones 18th in their "35 Best Female Marvel Characters Who Dominate The MCU & Comics" list.
 In 2022, Nerdist included Jessica Jones in their "8 Awesome Women Detectives in Comics" list.
 In 2022, CBR.com ranked Jessica Jones and Luke Cage 2nd in their "10 Healthiest Marvel Couples" list and 4th in their "10 Best Marvel Couples" list.
 In 2022, Screen Rant included Jessica Jones in their "10 Best Street-Level Heroes In Marvel Comics" list.

Literary reception

Volumes

Alias - 2003 
According to Diamond Comic Distributors, Alias #19 was the 63rd best selling comic book in February 2003. Alias #28 was the 73rd best selling comic book in November 2003.

Graeme Mcmillian of Wired stated, "The comic book that introduced Jessica Jones launched Marvel's "R-rated" Max imprint, finally letting fans know that their favorite superheroes did, in fact, know how to swear, they just felt very uncomfortable doing it. Taking full advantage of the freedoms offered by the imprint, creators Brian Michael Bendis and Michael Gaydos created Jones to be one of the company's most well-rounded female characters: flawed, bitter, self-destructive, and far more optimistic than she would ever allow anyone else to see. The roots of Jessica Jones are all here." Guillermo Kurten of Screen Rant ranked the Alias comic book series 5th in their "Brian Michael Bendis' best comic books" list, saying, "Alias was Bendis' gritty run alongside artist Michael Gaydos on superhero-turned-private investigator Jessica Jones. In this series, Jessica Jones was once known as the superhero Jewel but turned away from that life. Alias was praised for its approach as a psychological character study, with the series unraveling pieces of Jessica Jones' past and developing her character as she learns to heal from her trauma."

Jessica Jones - 2016

Vol. 1 
According to Diamond Comic Distributors, Jessica Jones #1 was the 22nd best selling comic book in October 2016.

Jesse Schedeen of IGN gave Jessica Jones #1 a grade of 8.8 out of 10. The issue features Bendis's writing and Gaydos' "heavy black lines and generally moody style," Schedeen writes. "The book has a vague noir quality, but also a humble slice-of-life one as well. This is a series that can showcase the shining heroes of the Marvel Universe and its most ordinary citizens. It's been a long time coming, but Jessica Jones has the solo book she deserves again. ... The fact that so much about Jessica's life has reverted to the old status quo isn't a drawback, but rather one of the book's main selling points." Blair Marnell of Nerdist gave Jessica Jones #1 a grade of 4 out of 5, stating, "It is a lot of fun to see her back in action, even if she doesn’t quite have the same edge that she did in her original run. There’s some minor swearing in the issue, but it feels a little tame ... If we didn’t know that Gaydos drew these pages within the last year, we’d swear that this was a lost story from his original run."

Vol. 2 
According to Diamond Comic Distributors, Jessica Jones #2 was the 78th best selling comic book in November 2016. Sean Edgar of Paste included the issue in the magazine's "Best Comic Book Covers of November 2016" list.; and
Joe Ruggirello of IGN gave Jessica Jones #2 a grade of 8.9 out of 10, asserting, "It just feels right to have the Bendis/Gaydos version of Jessica Jones back ... for a series that seems to pick up right where we left off 12 years ago. ... [T]his new series wouldn’t be the same without Michael Gaydos. His rendering of past Luke and Jessica is made poignant by their current state, the passage of time and damage done clearly expressed in their eyes."

Jessica Jones - Marvel Digital Original (Jessica Jones: Blind Spot - 2018) 
According to Diamond Comic Distributors, Jessica Jones - Marvel Digital Original #1 was the 460th best selling graphic novel in 2018.

Chase Magnett of Comicbook.com gave Jessica Jones - Marvel Digital Original #1 a grade of 5 out of 5, saying, "Jessica Jones is in very good hands. This first, surprise issue nails everything that readers have come to want from the character. The dialogue is pitch perfect, taking readers on a tour of the Marvel universe with plenty of small jokes, affectionate exchanges, and banter. There is a great detective story that plays out like a Chandler novel with an excellent added touch of drawing out details with inset panels. Most of all, there is a lot of heart both in Jessica's attitude and the family she has built. There is simply a lot to like about this comic that serves as both an introduction and continuation of one of Marvel's best. What a pleasant surprise." Jesse Schedeen of IGN included the Jessica Jones - Marvel Digital Original comic book series in their "Top Comics to Buy This Week" list in the week of October 29, 2019, stating, "Jessica Jones is one of the many major new characters Brian Bendis co-created during his long tenure at Marvel, and a heroine in need of a new steward now that Bendis has moved to DC. She found that in Kelly Thompson, the Marvel writer perhaps best suited to continue Jessica's troubled journey. For better or worse, Marvel elected to publish Thompson and Mattia De Lulis' Jessica Jones miniseries in digital-only form earlier this year. Whether it flew under the radar at the time or you simply prefer print to digital, now's your chance to see Jessica flourish under a new creative team." Sam Stone of CBR.com called the Jessica Jones - Marvel Digital Original comic book series one of the "best Jessica Jones stories," asserting, "Arriving in 2018, Jessica Jones: Blind Spot was a three-issue Marvel Digital series by Kelly Thompson and Mattia De Lulis. This was a new team to take on the character, but they smartly kept the private investigation aspects of her story and added a new look. In this, Jessica investigated a serial killer in New York City killing women with powers. When someone framed Jessica, she went to Doctor Strange for help and the body count began to rise. This kept Jones at her street-level best, telling a hard-boiled detective story."

Jessica Jones: Purple Daughter - 2019 
According to Diamond Comic Distributors, Jessica Jones: Purple Daughter #1 was the 321st best selling graphic novel in 2019.

Peyton Hinckle of ComicsVerse wrote, "You can’t really talk about Jessica Jones: Purple Daughter without talking about the art and, more specifically, the artist. Mattia De Iulis pulls out what might be his best work for this series. Realistic, yet distinctive, Iulis has a style that naturally lends itself to darker comics (like Jessica Jones: Purple Daughter). An artist with heavily stylized linework just wouldn’t have given the series the same weight and sense of reality. Part of the reason why we feel like Jessica’s life really is falling apart is because she has a relatable face. Iulis’ work is so realistic that it almost feels like readers are peaking into Jessica’s non-fictitious story. As emotions run high for Jessica, emotions run high for readers as well. The second artist, Filipe Andrade, penciled the fake reality scene, where Jessica briefly thinks she’s an idyllic little housewife. Iulis’ realistic style definitely wouldn’t have worked for this portion of the story. Andrade’s heavily stylized linework perfectly emphasizes the distance Jessica has from reality at this point in the plot. This series flew under a lot of comic fans’ radar. Since it’s an online-only series, it didn’t get publicity from LCBS or an array of variant covers. It’s not nearly as flashy as most of Marvel’s recent publications but, quality wise, it’s better. From the storyline to the art, this series excels in almost every way. If you’ve never read Jessica Jones, Jessica Jones: Purple Daughter is for you…and, honestly, if you’ve read tons of Jessica Jones’ arcs, Jessica Jones: Purple Daughter is still for you. It’s what so few comics are nowadays: complex, entertaining, and visually stunning. Don’t miss out on it." Christian Jones of Stardust gave Jessica Jones: Purple Daughter #1 a 9-star rating, saying, "Kelly Thompson expertly establishes the event that has torn Luke and Jessica’s lives apart and the ensuing trauma of that. As a reader, you feel the doubt, the anger and the helplessness that these characters feel. As a mother, Jessica is placed in the most horrifying position that a parent can be placed in. Absolute and unconditional love for her child whilst having to face her worst nightmare every time she looks at her baby. Jessica Jones creator Brian Michael Bendis’ great talent was humanising his characters, but Thompson has taken it to a whole other level. The artwork by Mattia de Lulis is simply wonderful. There’s a photographic realism to his work that suits the story and characters perfectly. The characters are the focus of every panel with the background being less distinct unless it serves the scene. This allows the reader to be really drawn in by the story without becoming distracted by superfluous details. The use of colour, shading, and lighting is also used to the utmost effect, creating a truly convincing piece of neo-noir on the printed page. If Marvel Comics should ever revisit the Noir universe, a Jessica Jones caper set amongst seedy whiskey-soaked, smoke-filled bars in New York’s criminal underworld is a must. After Brian Michael Bendis’ triumphant run, Kelly Thompson’s assured direction of Jessica Jones looks set to flourish. Bendis created a cynical, flawed, world-weary, reluctant superhero. It’s exciting to see what facets Thompson will bring to one of Marvel Comics most interesting characters."

Jessica Jones: Blind Spot - 2020 
According to Diamond Comic Distributors, Jessica Jones: Blind Spot #1 was the 128th best selling comic book in January 2020. Jessica Jones: Blind Spot #2 was the 150th best selling comic book in January 2020.

Grace wright of Screen Rant called Jessica Jones: Blind Spot #1 a "brilliant new take," saying, "While Blind Spot is significant for a number of reasons, Thompson hits on one of the biggest in a letter at the end of the first issue: it's the first time Jessica Jones’s original creative team, Bendis and Gaydos, have passed the torch to a new writer and artist in a solo book. Jessica Jones made her first appearance in Alias #1 almost two decades ago, and has been making expletive-filled waves in the Marvel Universe ever since. Jessica has certainly come a long way from her days begging for an audience at the front gates of the Avengers mansion, with her marriage to Luke Cage and the birth of their daughter, Dani Cage. Bendis and Gaydos have seen her through a number of trials and evolutions, but Thompson and De Iulis are ready to grab the character's reins and take her back to... a new sort of origin. Blind Spot successfully gives readers a new insight into Jessica Jones, without trodding on any of the character’s development in years past. In fact, before one of Jessica's many haunting decisions reappears, she is more intently focused on her domestic life than any sort of imminent doom. Jessica seems to have grown, picking out the correctly-shaped cereal for her toddler, as opposed to whiskey for herself. While that isn't where Jessica is going to stay, it's a nice acknowledgment of Bendis and Gaydos’ work, setting the tone for Thompson and De Iulis as they undertake the mighty feat of forging their own path in Jessica’s story."

The Variants - 2022 
According to Diamond Comic Distributors,The Variants #1 was the 94th best selling comic book in June 2022.

Hannah Rose of CBR.com called The Variants #1 an "intriguing first issue," stating, "Simone captures Jessica's essence well, balancing her hardened if heavy-handed cynicism with her vulnerability and humanity. The sequence where Jess tries on varying shades of lipstick under the watchful eye of the sales clerk is one of the best instances of this softer, more insecure, and human side of the otherwise badass and uncompromising character. Similarly, her more compassionate side is forced out by Daredevil as both hero and attorney, calling on her to assist one of his clients, a girl similarly manipulated by the Purple Man. Jess and Daredevil's relationship here is an uneasy one, their trust in one another is tested thanks to Daredevil's lie-detecting powers, yet the respect between them is plain as day. Powerhouse artist Phil Noto takes the reigns in Variants #1. His line art is elegant, smooth, fluid, and pretty to look at. He sticks to realistic body proportions with just enough stylistic liberty to keep everything easy on the eye and purely in the realm of fiction. He uses a soft, muted color palette with occasional washes of color, especially blue and fuschia. But, for the most part, he keeps things grounded with an appropriately sad, drab beige. Variants #1 demonstrates an excellent understanding of an often underutilized character, exploring her mindset and morals in the aftermath of a harrowing event. Unfortunately, its use of the multiverse leaves viewers wanting more. Time will tell if these different versions of Jessica's character and the alternate worlds they inhabit can be given the attention they deserve." Jenna Anderson of Comicbook.com gave The Variants #1 a grade of 5 out of 5, asserting, "The Variants #1 is not only a beautifully-constructed new look at the Marvel multiverse that fans know and love, it's a truly stunning and revolutionary new chapter in the ongoing story of Jessica Jones. Gail Simone's script brings the heartfelt, but world-weary tone that Jessica uniquely embodies, while laying the groundwork for a fascinating new twist on doppelgangers from another universe. When coupled with Phil Noto's effortlessly cool and timeless art, The Variants is an absolute knockout for Marvel Comics, and I could not be more excited to see what else it has in store."

Other versions 

Multiple versions of Jessica Jones have appeared in Marvel's multiverse. In the 2005 "House of M" storyline, Jessica was apparently dating Scott Lang.

In What If, Jones accepted Captain America's offer to work for The Avengers. Perceiving that something was amiss with Wanda Maximoff (the Scarlet Witch), she alerted the other Avengers, ensuring that the catastrophic events depicted in "Avengers Disassembled" and "House of M" would never occur. Jessica married Captain America.

In Ultimate Spider-Man, Jones appeared as a senior student in the school Peter Parker attended. She was the executive producer of the school's television network. She later became jealous of Mary Jane Watson's superior film skills. She attempted to deduce Spider-Man's secret identity for the school newspaper and may have been suspicious about Peter Parker. Later on after the events of Ultimatum, she claimed to have abandoned her attempts to figure out who Spider-Man was and instead wanted to focus on his heroics.

In Spider-Man Loves Mary Jane, Jessica was a student at Mary Jane's high school and was a former friend of Mary Jane until she became a goth. Mary Jane spent more time with Jessica after her breakup with Ned Leeds and became more goth-like until Jessica told Mary Jane it did not fit her.

During the events of "Infinity Wars," Gamora used the Infinity Stones to fold the universe in half, resulting in the creation of Warp World, where characters and histories were merged. Jessica Jones merged with Janice Lincoln and became this universe's version of the Beetle. She was also the fiancé of Scott Banner aka Little Monster (an amalgamation of Scott Lang and Bruce Banner).

In Spider-Man: Life Story, Jessica briefly dated Peter Parker after his split with Mary Jane and helped him track down the elderly Norman Osborn. Much like her Earth-616 counterpart, Jessica Jones of this universe also began a private investigator and founder of Alias Investigations.

During the "Secret Wars" storyline, different versions of Jessica Jones existed in each of the Battleworld domains:
 In the Battleworld domain of Arcadia, Luke Cage and Jessica Jones assisted in fighting a horde of zombies from the Deadlands after the female Loki attacked part of the Shield.
 In the Battleworld domain of the Walled City of New York, Luke Cage and Jessica Jones are married and live in their residence in Harlem.

In other media

Television 

Jessica Jones appears in the Netflix series set in the Marvel Cinematic Universe, portrayed by Krysten Ritter as an adult and by Elizabeth Cappuccino as a teenager
Jessica Jones first appears in Jessica Jones. As a child, she was in a car accident that killed her parents and put her in a coma. After she regained consciousness, Jessica was legally adopted by talent agent Dorothy Walker, thereby becoming the adopted sister of Trish Walker. She did her graduation from Midtown School of Science and Technology in Queens, the same school in which Peter Parker used to study, although she graduated much earlier from the school when Parker had not even joined, unlike in the comics in which Parker and her were classmates. As an adult, Jessica crosses paths with Kilgrave and spends eight months under his control, snapping out of it after she kills Luke Cage's wife Reva Connors on Kilgrave's orders. In the first season, she experiences post-traumatic stress disorder as a result of what Kilgrave did to her and drinks in excess to numb her pain and guilt. Her Jewel costume from the comics appears briefly in the fifth episode,"AKA: The Sandwich Saved Me", although she refuses to wear it and rejects Trish's suggestion of Jewel as an alias. In the second season of Jessica Jones, Jones takes on a new case after the events surrounding her encounter with Kilgrave, leading her towards her mother who she believed died in the crash. In the third season, Jessica has to deal with the serial killer Salinger, who tests Jessica and Trish's recovering bond as sisters.
In the episode "The Blessing of Many Fractures" of the first season of Iron Fist, Joy Meachum indirectly mentions to her brother Ward that she hired Jessica in the past to take compromising pictures of members on the Rand Enterprises board of directors.
 Jessica Jones stars in The Defenders.  After the events of the second season of Daredevil and the first season of Iron Fist, Jones is caught in a conspiracy involving The Hand.  In the first episode, Jones investigates the disappearance of a man, and finds explosive items in his apartment.  As the conspiracy widens and eventually ties with the man's disappearance, Jones is attacked by the same man, who kills himself to avoid being captured by a masked figure.  Before his impending death, the man tells Jones about The Hand, who is chasing him for trying to expose their crimes.  Jones then briefly teams up with Matt Murdock, Jones' ex Luke Cage, and Danny Rand in a battle against The Hand.  After finding plans from the killed man to destroy the headquarters of The Hand in New York, Jones and Murdock rally their allies to defeat the organization once and for all.  Murdock apparently sacrifices himself to get the others out of the exploding building.  After the battle, Jones moves on and continues to be a detective, while also looking to protect the city.
Jessica Jones is referenced by the character Marci Stahl in episode 5 of season 2 of the Netflix series Daredevil, whilst she is talking to Foggy, as a colleague in her office who is a target of the DEA because of her vigilantism. In the season 3 finale, Matt Murdock jokes that, as a private investigator, Karen Page is "more stable than Jessica Jones."

Video games 

 Jessica Jones appears as an unlockable playable character in Marvel Future Fight.
 Jessica Jones appeared as an unlockable playable character in Marvel Avengers Alliance. 
 Jessica Jones appears as an unlockable playable character in Lego Marvel's Avengers, voiced by Tara Strong.
 Jessica Jones appeared in Marvel Avengers Academy, voiced by Michelle Phan.
 Jessica Jones appeared in Marvel Heroes, voiced again by Tara Strong. She was one of the Heroes for Hire that Luke Cage could summon in-game.
 Several Jessica Jones cards are featured in Marvel War of Heroes.
 Jessica Jones  appears as an unlockable playable character in Marvel Puzzle Quest.
 Jessica Jones's detective agency Alias Investigations is seen in Spider-Man.
 Jessica Jones is a playable character in Marvel Strike Force. She is a City Controller allied with the Defenders and A-Force teams. Her default costume is based on her attire in Jessica Jones. 
 Jessica Jones appears as a NPC in Marvel Ultimate Alliance 3: The Black Order, voiced again by Tara Strong.
 Jessica Jones appears in the digital collectible card game Marvel Snap.

References

External links 
 Jessica Jones at Marvel.com
 Bendis Interview at Comic Book Resources (August 2005)
 Comic Book Urban Legends Revealed: Which Jessica for Alias? 

Avengers (comics) characters
Characters created by Brian Michael Bendis
Comics characters introduced in 2001
Fictional alcohol abusers
Fictional characters from New York City
Fictional characters with post-traumatic stress disorder
Fictional characters with superhuman durability or invulnerability
Fictional private investigators
Fictional reporters
Fictional sole survivors
Marvel Comics American superheroes
Marvel Comics characters with accelerated healing
Marvel Comics characters with superhuman strength
Marvel Comics female superheroes
Marvel Comics mutates
Marvel Comics orphans
Superheroes who are adopted
Female characters in television